Randi Michelsen (20 February 1903 – 12 August 1981) was a Danish film actress. She appeared in 35 films between 1927 and 1974. She was born in Copenhagen, Denmark and died in Denmark.

Selected filmography
 Københavnere (1933)
 Tyrannens fald (1942)
 Hr. Petit (1948)
 Mosekongen (1950)
 Vejrhanen (1952)
 Min datter Nelly (1955)
 Qivitoq (1956)

External links

1903 births
1981 deaths
Danish film actresses
Actresses from Copenhagen
20th-century Danish actresses
Burials at Holmen Cemetery